The 1999 Nigerian Senate election in Ondo State was held on February 20, 1999, to elect members of the Nigerian Senate to represent Ondo State. Lawrence Ayo representing Ondo North, Gbenga Ogunniya representing Ondo Central and Omololu Meroyi representing Ondo South all won on the platform of the Alliance for Democracy.

Overview

Summary

Results

Ondo North 
The election was won by Lawrence Ayo of the Alliance for Democracy.

Ondo Central 
The election was won by Gbenga Ogunniya of the Alliance for Democracy.

Ondo South 
The election was won by Omololu Meroyi of the Alliance for Democracy.

References 

February 1999 events in Nigeria
Ond
Ondo State Senate elections